Brittney Anne McConn Bottoms (born June 17, 1980) is an American former competitive figure skater. She placed fourth at the 1998 World Junior Championships and won the Nebelhorn Trophy later that year. Her highest senior-level placement at the U.S. Championships was seventh, which she achieved three times. McConn retired from competition in 2001. She became a member of U.S. Figure Skating's International Committee.

Programs

Results
GP: Grand Prix; JGP: Junior Series (Junior Grand Prix)

References

External links
 

1980 births
American female single skaters
Living people
People from Largo, Florida
21st-century American women